The Left Centre was a political party in Hungary in the 1860s and 1870s led by Kálmán Tisza and Kálmán Ghyczy.

History
The Left Centre finished second to the Deák Party in elections in 1865, 1869 and 1872. It was opposed to the Austro-Hungarian Compromise of 1867, and continued to demand an independent Hungarian army.

Despite its rivalry with the Deák Party, the two merged in February 1875 to form the Liberal Party. A group of former Left Centre members broke away to reform the party in 1877, but it was not successful.

References

Defunct political parties in Hungary
Political parties disestablished in 1875
Political parties in Austria-Hungary
Liberal parties in Hungary